The Arboretum de Vendresse, also known as the Arboretum du Bois de la Vierge, is an arboretum located in Vendresse, Ardennes, Grand Est, France. It is open daily without charge.

The arboretum was established in 1912 by histologist Paul Bouin (1870–1962). It is located near the ruins of the Château de la Cassine, home of Louis of Gonzaga and Henriette de Clèves, and accessible from the path of the Bois de la Vierge. It contains a variety of local tree species, as well as an avenue planted with Douglas firs.

See also 
 List of botanical gardens in France

References 
 Tourisme Champagne Ardenne description
 Tourisme Ardennes description
 EMD-net description (French)
 Panoramio photo

Vendresse, Arboretum de
Vendresse, Arboretum de